Richter may refer to:

Science and technology
 Richter magnitude scale, a scale measuring the strength of earthquakes, created by Charles Francis Richter
 Richter tuning scale developed in 1825 to which harmonicas are usually tuned
 Richter's transformation or Richter's syndrome, complication of blood-related neoplasms

People with the name
 See: Richter (surname)

Places
 Richter, Kansas
 Richter Peaks, a group of mountain peaks near the southern end of Alexander Island, Antarctica
 Richter Brewery, a building in Escanaba, Michigan on the National Register of Historic Places

Brands and enterprises
 Richter (toy company), a German toy manufacturer from the early 20th century
 Gedeon Richter Ltd., a Hungarian pharmaceutical company
 Richter LLP, a Canadian financial consulting firm
 Richter10.2 Media Group LLC, an American Agency

Arts, entertainment, and media

Fictional characters
 Richter, the villain's right-hand man in science fiction thriller Total Recall
 Richter Abend, a character from the game Tales of Symphonia: Dawn of the New World
 Richter Belmont, a character from the Castlevania game series (see List of Castlevania characters)
 Richter Berg, hitman in the action games Hotline Miami and Hotline Miami 2: Wrong Number
 Holt Ann Richter, midget friend of Cleveland Brown on The Cleveland Show
 Renate Richter, Nazi schoolteacher and co-protagonist of the 2012 movie Iron Sky
 Richter Sakamaki, brother of Karlheinz, Diabolik Lovers

Music
 Richter (electro rock), an electro-rock band from Buenos Aires, Argentina
 The Richter Scales, an a cappella group from San Francisco, CA that was active from 2000 to 2014
 "Richter Scale", a 1997 hip hop single by EPMD
 "Goin' Richter", a 1998 rock song by The Ziggens

Print
 Richter 10, a 1996 science fiction novel by Arthur C. Clarke and Mike McQuay